Carl Urbano (December 20, 1910 – October 16, 2003) was an American animator and director, best remembered for the promotional animated short A Is for Atom (1953) which promotes atomic energy.

Life
During the 1950s, Carl would be found directing for John Sutherland Productions, directing theatrical quality cartoons for industry.

Later in his career, he was at H-B directing under supervisor Ray Patterson at Hanna-Barbera Productions.

Some of his directing credits at Hanna-Barbera include:

Godzilla (1978–1979)
Scooby's All Stars (1978) Season 2
Challenge of the Super Friends (1978)
Yogi's Space Race (1978)
Buford and the Galloping Ghost (1979)
The New Fred and Barney Show (1979)
Fred and Barney Meet the Thing (1979)
Fred and Barney Meet the Shmoo (1979–1980)
Scooby-Doo and Scrappy-Doo (1979)
The Flintstones' New Neighbors (1980)
The Smurfs (1981)
The Flintstone Kids (1986–1988)
Tom & Jerry Kids (1990–1993)

Sources

External links

American animators
1910 births
2003 deaths
American animated film directors
Hanna-Barbera people